Ford Thames may refer to:
Thames (commercial vehicles), often referred to as Ford Thames
Ford Thames E83W, a light commercial vehicle produced from 1938 and 1957
Ford Thames 300E, a car derived van produced from 1954 to 1961
Ford Thames 307E,  a small panel van produced from 1961 to 1967
Ford Thames 400E, a commercial vehicle produced from 1957 to 1965
Duxford, Oxfordshire, the one remaining ford crossing of the River Thames in England